The pectinate line (dentate line) is a line which divides the upper two-thirds and lower third of the anal canal.  Developmentally, this line represents the hindgut-proctodeum junction.

It is an important anatomical landmark in humans, and several distinctions can be made based upon the location of a structure relative to this line:

Additional images

References

External links
 

Digestive system
Anatomic Landmarks